This is a list of notable quantitative analysts (by surname); see also § Seminal publications there, and List of financial economists.

Pioneers
 Kenneth Arrow, (1921 – 2017), American economist, Social choice theory.
 Louis Bachelier, (1870–1946), French mathematician, Pioneer of financial mathematics.
 Jacob Bernoulli, (1654–1705), Swiss mathematician, discovered the mathematical constant  while studying Compound interest.
 Fischer Black, (1938 – 1995), American economist, famous for Black–Scholes equation.
 Michael Brennan, (born 1942), co-designed the Brennan-Schwartz interest rate model, and pioneer of real options theory.
Vinzenz Bronzin (1872 – 1970), Italian mathematics professor; published option pricing formulae in 1908, as well as a formulation of put–call parity. 
 Phelim Boyle, (born 1941), (Irish physicist), initiated the use of Monte Carlo methods and Trinomial trees in option pricing.
 John Carrington Cox, (born 1943), one of the inventors of the Cox-Ross-Rubinstein model.
 Emanuel Derman, (born 1945), particle physicist, co-author of Black–Derman–Toy model.
 Richard A. Epstein, (born 1927), notable American game theorist and physicist.
 Eugene Fama, (born 1939) American economist, work on portfolio theory and asset pricing, laureate Nobel Memorial Prize in Economic Sciences.
 Victor Glushkov, (1923 – 1982), founding father of information theory in the Soviet Union.
 Benjamin Graham, (1894 – 1976) American economist and professional investor and first proponent of value investing.
 Myron J. Gordon, (1920 – 2010) American economist; noted for Gordon model.
 Robert Haugen, (1942 - 2013) US  financial economist and a pioneer in the field of quantitative investing and low-volatility investing.
 Thomas Ho, author of the Ho–Lee model and key rate duration.
 John C. Hull, noted for the Hull-White model.
 Jonathan E. Ingersoll, (born 1949), one of the authors of the Cox–Ingersoll–Ross model of the yield curve.
 Kiyoshi Itō, (1915 – 2008) was a Japanese mathematician whose work is now called Itō calculus.
 Robert A. Jarrow, a co-creator of the Heath–Jarrow–Morton framework for pricing interest rate derivatives.
 John Kelly, (1923–1965), American physicist, Bell Labs scientist, best known for formulating the Kelly criterion.
 Sang Bin Lee, author of the Ho–Lee model.
 Martin L. Leibowitz, developed dedicated portfolio theory.
 Francis Longstaff, (born 1956), known for the Longstaff-Schwartz interest rate model.
 Frederick Macaulay, (1882–1970), Canadian-American economist, introduced the concept of Bond duration.
 Harry Markowitz, (born 1927), American economist, Nobel Memorial Prize in Economic Sciences. Pioneering work in Modern Portfolio Theory. 
 Benoît Mandelbrot, (1924 – 2010) was a French American mathematician, the father of fractal geometry.
 Robert C. Merton, (born 1944), American economist, and  laureate Nobel Memorial Prize in Economic Sciences.
 John von Neumann, (1903 – 1957), Hungarian American mathematician made major contributions to a vast range of fields
 Victor Niederhoffer, (born 1943), American, the father of Statistical arbitrage and of Market microstructure studies.
 Stephen Ross,  (1944 – 2017), American, known for initiating several important theories and models in financial economics.
 Mark Rubinstein,  (1944 – 2019), American, a senior academic in the field of finance, focusing on derivatives, particularly options.
 Myron Scholes, (born 1941), Canadian-American, financial economist who is best known as one of the authors of the Black–Scholes equation.
 Eduardo Schwartz, (born 1940), American, pioneering research in the real options method of pricing investments under uncertainty.
 Claude Shannon, (1916 – 2001), American,  mathematician, electronic engineer, and cryptographer known as "the father of Information Theory".
 William F. Sharpe, (born 1934), American Nobel Memorial Prize in Economic Sciences, one of the originators of the Capital Asset Pricing Model. 
 Nassim Taleb, (born 1960), Lebanon, considers himself less a businessman than an epistemologist of randomness.
 Thales, (c. 624 BC – c. 546 BC), Greek, one of the Seven Sages of Greece, made the first recorded option trade.
 Ed Thorp, American, (born 1932), author of Beat the Dealer, the first book to mathematically prove, in 1962, that the house advantage in blackjack could be overcome by card counting.
 Alan White, noted for the Hull-White model.
 Oldrich Vasicek, (born 1942), Czech, breakthrough paper, describing the dynamics of the yield curve; see Vasicek model.

Other well-known figures
 Cliff Asness, (born 1966), American, co-founder of AQR Capital Management, credited with popularizing value and momentum strategies.
David Blitz, (born 1973), Dutch, founding researcher of Robeco Quantitative Investments contributor to factor investing literature.
 Jean-Philippe Bouchaud, (born 1962), French physicist and econophysicist, former editor of Quantitative Finance.
 Damiano Brigo, (born 1966), Italian, known for results in systems theory, probability and mathematical finance.
 Aaron Brown, (born 1956), American risk expert, known for the idea that the economics of modern global derivatives evolved from gambling.
 Gunduz Caginalp, (1952 - 2021), Turkish American, researcher known for work in quantitative behavioral finance.
 Neil Chriss, American, mathematician, academic, hedge fund manager, first director of the Courant Institute Mathematical Finance Program.
 Jakša Cvitanić, (born 1962), Croatian, Professor of Mathematical Finance at the California Institute of Technology.
 Raphael Douady, (born 1959) French mathematician, Head of Laboratory of Excellence on Financial Regulation at the Sorbonne.
 Darrell Duffie, (born 1954) Canadian, Dean Witter Distinguished Professor of Finance at Stanford Graduate School of Business.
 Bruno Dupire, (1958), French, known for showing how to derive a local volatility model.
 Frank J. Fabozzi, American, prolific author, co-developer of the Kalotay–Williams–Fabozzi model.
 J. Doyne Farmer, (born 1952), American, one of the founders of the Prediction Company. 
 Jim Gatheral, Scottish, known for work on the volatility smile and the volatility surface. 
 Hélyette Geman French mathematician known for change of numeraire methods in mathematical finance.
 Kenneth C. Griffin, (born 1968), is an American hedge fund manager.
 Albert Hibbs, (1924 - 2003) noted American mathematician and the "voice" of JPL.
 Peter Jaeckel, German mathematician who has influenced the development of the use of Monte Carlo methods in Mathematical Finance.
 Mark S. Joshi,  (1969 - 2017)  British Australian author, researcher and consultant in mathematical finance.
 Andrew Kalotay, (born 1941), Hungarian-American, Wall Street quant and chess master, statistician and mathematician.
 Nicole El Karoui, (born 1944), mathematician, and pioneer in the development of Mathematical Finance.
 Piotr Karasinski, quantitative finance pioneer; best known for the Black–Karasinski model.
 Sheen T. Kassouf, (1929–2006) economist known for research in financial mathematics.
 David X. Li, (born 1960), Chinese, pioneered the use of Gaussian copula models for the pricing of collateralized debt obligations (CDOs). 
 Andrew Lo, (born 1960), leading authority on hedge funds and financial engineering; he proposed the Adaptive market hypothesis.
 David Luenberger, (born 1937) mathematical scientist known for his research and his textbooks.
 William Margrabe author of Margrabe's formula.
 Fabio Mercurio, (born 1966), Italian, mathematician, internationally known for incomplete markets theory.
 Attilio Meucci, Italian, applied mathematician, known for refining the Black-Litterman model and other portfolio and risk management methodologies.
 Salih Neftçi, (1947- 2009) leading expert in the fields of stochastic processes and financial engineering.
 Norman Packard, (born 1954), American, is a chaos theory physicist and one of the founders of the Prediction Company and ProtoLife.
 William Perraudin, British, economist, specializing in the fields of risk and pricing of debt instruments.
 Riccardo Rebonato, former physicist specializing in yield curve modeling and risk management.
 Isaak Russman, (1938 - 2005) was a Russian mathematician and economist.
 David E. Shaw, (born 1951) computer scientist and computational biochemist who founded D. E. Shaw & Co.
 Peng Shige, (born 1947), Chinese, mathematician noted for his contributions in stochastic analysis and mathematical finance.
 Steven E. Shreve, academic and widely read author in mathematical finance.
 James Harris Simons, (born 1938), American hedge fund manager, mathematician, and philanthropist.
 Stuart Turnbull, Jarrow–Turnbull model 
 Pim van Vliet, (born 1977), Dutch quantitative fund manager, researcher with contributions to low-volatility investing. 
 Paul Wilmott, (born 1959) UK researcher, consultant and lecturer in quantitative finance.
 Marc Yor, (1949 - 2014), French mathematician, known for work on stochastic processes, especially properties of semimartingales, Brownian motion and other Lévy processes.

Quantitative analysts